Nexopia is a Canadian social networking website created in 2003, by 18-year old Timo Ewalds. It was designed for ages 14 and up, but was later lowered to 13. Users are able to create and design profiles, a friends list, blogs, galleries, and compose articles and forums. Interaction is accomplished through an internal personal messaging system,  public user comments on profiles, blogs or through threads and posts on the forums. In November 2012, Nexopia was acquired by digital ad network Ideon Media.

History
Nexopia was founded in 2003, and became Canada's first online social network. It evolved from the community site called Enternexus.com, another website built by Ewalds. The initial beta site was limited to 70 members and eventually led to Nexopia.com. When Enternexus.com relaunched as Nexopia.com, initial growth was said to be 100 users in four days, and 225,000 users within 22 months. For a brief period during that time, Nexopia.com maintained growth of 10% or 3500 average new members per day. In 2008, Nexopia announced 1.2 million active registered users and 1 billion page views per month as well as the investment of an undisclosed amount of the venture capital fund Burda Digital Ventures (now Acton Capital Partners).

In October 2010, the site had just under 1.5 million users and nearly 35 billion hits. In January 2012, the site reported 1,636,990 users and 35,517,895,992 hits.

The website uses Interac Online, a service that allows account holders at participating banks to make payments through online banking.

Profile update
In 2016 Nexopia updated its user profile pages, the largest revision since the site's launch in 2003. The redesign included a streamlined layout, Ajax controls for messages, galleries and profile editing, new profile skinning options and image resizing. The update caused controversy among users due to issues such as slow load times, disappearing profile pictures, undelivered private messages, forms not working correctly, and people upset because the site design was different. Nexopia staff polled users, and found that the majority disliked the new profile picture slider the most. Nexopia staff then provided the option to switch between the classic and new profile picture viewers.

Forums
The forums are the main social aspect of the website. Nexopia 'Plus' subscribers can create their own forums, which can be open or available only to only invited members. In early 2016, the website changed to online forums. The forum uses software from XenForo, replacing WordPress.

Members
Over 95% of users are Canadian, with over 1.4 million member accounts and over 200,000 active users and a hit count of over 33 billion.

No nudity, racism, violence, or gore are allowed on forums or profiles, although photos of a small amount of marijuana and the use of pipes and bongs are allowed; alcohol is also acceptable. All profile pictures are checked by photo moderators before appearing on a user page. Photos on a user's profile are not checked, but a "report abuse" button allows another user to report abuses. Nexopia prohibits copyright infringement.

In March 2007, four students from the Elk Island school district in Sherwood Park, Alberta were expelled from school and twenty were given suspensions in a case of cyberbullying. Students used Nexopia to create teacher profiles in which classmates posted defamatory, silly, derogatory and libellous information on the teachers' pages.

Criticism
Nexopia was criticized by parent groups, who blamed their children's problems on the website and tried to have it shut down. This forced the site to become more strict about user posts.

Nexopia became a target for online predators. Since a user's profile can be completely open to the public, profile images and information are viewable. Users may post personal information such as their address, telephone number, family members, relationship status and school.

Online spam increased such as through "dummy" accounts that spam users, linking them to websites containing porn or malicious information. Users who do not follow the rules may get a simple ban from the website or have their account "frozen".

In March 2012, the website was found to be in violation of federal privacy laws by keeping personal information indefinitely. As of November 2012, Nexopia was working with the Privacy Commissioner to ensure regulatory compliance.

The site was used by convicted serial killer Cody Legebokoff, who met one victim, fifteen year old Loren Leslie, there.

Membership
Users with free accounts have access to standard features, such as forum posting, private messaging, user profiles with comments, photo uploading, a user blog and an image gallery. Monthly paid subscriptions are offered at $5 to fee gain access to extra features such as advanced user search, forum creation, increased media gallery capacity and online file storage, and the removal of ads.

References

Blog hosting services
Companies based in Edmonton
Companies based in Toronto
Internet forum hosting
Internet properties established in 2003
Canadian social networking websites